Natalya Sergeyevna Korostelyova (born October 4, 1981 in Chusovoy, Perm Krai) is a Russian cross country skier who competed since 2002. She won a bronze in the team sprint event at the 2010 Winter Olympics in Vancouver.

Korostelyova also won a bronze medal in the 4 × 5 km relay at the FIS Nordic World Ski Championships 2003 in Val di Fiemme and had her best individual finish of ninth in the individual sprint at those same championships.

Korostelyova's lone World Cup victory came at a team sprint event in Germany in 2008.

Cross-country skiing results
All results are sourced from the International Ski Federation (FIS).

Olympic Games
 1 medal – (1 bronze)

World Championships
 1 medal – (1 bronze)

World Cup

Season standings

Individual podiums
1 victory – (1 ) 
8 podiums – (5 , 3 )

Team podiums

 1 victory – (1 ) 
 6 podiums – (2 , 4 )

References

External links
 

1981 births
Living people
People from Chusovoy
Cross-country skiers at the 2010 Winter Olympics
Olympic bronze medalists for Russia
Olympic cross-country skiers of Russia
Russian female cross-country skiers
Olympic medalists in cross-country skiing
FIS Nordic World Ski Championships medalists in cross-country skiing
Medalists at the 2010 Winter Olympics
Sportspeople from Perm Krai